The Central Corridor is a transport and trading route located in East and Central Africa. Its end point is the Tanzanian port city of Dar es Salaam, where it connects to the rest of the world via shipping. From Dar es Salaam, the corridor runs inland, serving the Tanzanian interior including its capital Dodoma and second city of Mwanza, as well as landlocked Rwanda and Burundi, and the eastern part of the Democratic Republic of the Congo. This route consists uses Tanzania's Central Line as well as connecting road networks.

The Central Corridor provides an alternative route to the ocean from Rwandan, Burundi and the DRC from the higher traffic Northern Corridor, which runs through Uganda and Kenya to the port of Mombasa.

References

Transport in Burundi
Transport in Rwanda
Transport in the Democratic Republic of the Congo
Transport in Tanzania